Herbert Rowland Askins (November 12, 1898 - December 1982) of Arizona was United States Assistant Secretary of the Navy from October 3, 1951, until January 20, 1953.

References

List of Assistant Secretaries of the Navy

United States Assistant Secretaries of the Navy
1898 births
1982 deaths